Aleksei Anatolyevich Yushkov (born 1 February 1967; died 29 August 1996 in a car accident) was a Russian professional footballer.

Club career
He made his professional debut in the Soviet Second League in 1984 for FC Uralmash Sverdlovsk. He played 1 game for FC Dynamo Moscow in the Soviet Cup.

Honours
 Soviet Top League bronze: 1991.
 Soviet Cup finalist: 1991.

European club competitions
With FC Torpedo Moscow.

 UEFA Cup 1990–91: 2 games.
 UEFA Cup 1991–92: 4 games.

References

1967 births
Sportspeople from Yekaterinburg
1996 deaths
Road incident deaths in Russia
Soviet footballers
Association football midfielders
Association football defenders
Russian footballers
Soviet Top League players
Russian Premier League players
FC Ural Yekaterinburg players
FC Zenit Saint Petersburg players
FC Torpedo Moscow players
FC Dynamo Moscow players
FC Nosta Novotroitsk players